Die Paldauer is an Austrian schlager group founded in 1969.

References

Austrian musical groups
Schlager groups